John Andrew Foster (5 May 1941 - 12 March 2009), known as John Foster, was a British philosopher and tutorial Fellow of Brasenose College, Oxford, from 1966 to 2005 (and then a Emeritus Fellow until his death in 2009). He authored several books, including The Case for Idealism (1982) and A World for Us: The Case for Phenomenalistic Idealism (2008). His A. J. Ayer (1985) was described by Anthony Quinton as "the only serious monograph" about Ayer's philosophy".

Biography
Foster was born in North London on 5 May 1941 and grew up in Southgate. He studied at Mercers' School, but had to transfer to the City of London School to do A-levels after Mercers' closure (about which he wrote a letter to The Times in protest). He started studying classics at Lincoln College, Oxford, but transferred to psychology, philosophy and physiology after discovering a distaste for studying ancient history. Foster stayed a further year at Lincoln, after obtaining a First in 1964, and began a D.Phil. The support of his doctoral supervisor, A. J. Ayer, ensured Foster’s election to a Stone-Platt Junior Research Fellowship at New College in 1965 and, a year later, to his tutorial Fellowship at Brasenose. He retained this position until ill health finally forced his early retirement, as a "Mr" in 2005. (As Peter J. N. Sinclair notes, most Brasenose Arts tutors of Foster's generation, never completed a doctoral thesis).  

Foster was a devoted Christian and an outspoken pro-life campaigner. Foster met his wife-to-be Helen in 1963 and the two married in Royal Tunbridge Wells in 1967. He joined the Church of England. In 1989 both John and Helen converted from Anglicanism to Roman Catholicism.

Foster died on 1 January 2009.

Philosophical work
In 2008, he put forward a thesis called phenomenalistic idealism, which combines phenomenalism and idealism.

Works
Books authored
(1982) The Case for Idealism. Routledge & Kegan Paul, London. .
(1985) A. J. Ayer. Routledge & Kegan Paul, Boston. .
(1991) The Immaterial Self: A Defence of the Cartesian Dualist Conception of Mind. Routledge, New York.  .
(2000) The Nature of Perception. Oxford University Press, Oxford. .
(2004) The Divine Lawmaker: Lectures on Induction, Laws of Nature, and the Existence of God. Oxford University Press, Oxford. .
(2008) A World for Us: The Case for Phenomenalistic Idealism. Oxford University Press, Oxford. 
Select papers/chapters

 (1976) "Meaning and Truth Theory" in: Gareth Evans, John McDowell (eds.) Truth and Meaning: Essays in Semantics Oxford. 1976.

Notes and references

1941 births
2009 deaths
Anglican philosophers
Converts to Roman Catholicism from Anglicanism
Idealists
Catholic philosophers
People educated at Mercers' School
20th-century British philosophers